Stacey G. Newman (born August 20, 1954) is an American politician from the state of Missouri. A member of the Democratic Party, Newman served in the Missouri House of Representatives, representing District 87 from 2009 to 2019, and was Chair of the Missouri House Progressive Caucus.

Newman took part in the national Million Mom March in Washington D.C. on Mothers Day 2000, pushing for stronger gun control after her 6-year-old daughter Sophie appeared on the national Rosie O'Donnell show talking about her fear of guns in school.  Newman helped form the St. Louis chapter of the Million Mom March and lobbied the general assembly for three years against concealed weapon legislation.  Her husband, Burt Newman, attorney, challenged the concealed weapon law in the Missouri Supreme Court, after the veto of the bill by Governor Bob Holden was overridden.

Newman was first elected to the Missouri House in a special election November 2009 after Steve Brown pleaded guilty to federal conspiracy charges and resigned his seat. In 2015, Newman introduced a bill in the Missouri House to regulate firearms as strictly as the state regulates abortion, by adding a 72-hour waiting period.

References

External links

1954 births
21st-century American politicians
Living people
Democratic Party members of the Missouri House of Representatives
Women state legislators in Missouri
21st-century American women politicians